Wilhelm Ferdinand Souchon (1825–1876) was a German painter.

Life 
Wilhelm Ferdinand Souchon was born in Halberstadt on 17 January 1825, and was of Huguenot descent. He was a pupil of August Rémy in Berlin, and furthered his studies in Munich (1849–1851) and Rome (1851–1854). He was a painter of religious and historical subjects and portraits. He did paintings for churches. He died in Weimar on 26 October 1876, aged 50.

Gallery

References

Sources 

 Beyer, Andreas; Savoy, Bénédicte; Tegethoff, Wolf, eds. "Souchon, Wilhelm Ferdinand". In Allgemeines Künstlerlexikon - Internationale Künstlerdatenbank - Online. Berlin, New York: K. G. Saur. Retrieved 9 October 2022.
 "Souchon, Wilhelm Ferdinand". Benezit Dictionary of Artists. 2011. Oxford Art Online. Retrieved 7 October 2022.

Further reading 

 Giesecke, Albert (1937). "Souchon, Wilhelm Ferdinand". In Vollmer, Hans (ed.). Allgemeines Lexikon der Bildenden Künstler von der Antike bis zur Gegenwart. Vol. 31: Siemering–Stephens. Leipzig: E. A. Seemann, p. 307.
 Müller, Hermann Alexander; Klunzinger, Karl; Seubert, Adolf, eds. (1864). "Souchon, Wilhelm Ferdinand". In Die Künstler aller Zeiten und Völker. Vol. 3: M–Z. Stuttgart: Ebner & Seubert. p. 570.
 Müller, Hermann Alexander (1882). "Souchon, Wilhelm Ferdinand". In Biographisches Künstler-Lexikon. Leipzig: Bibliographischen Instituts. p. 498.
 Müller, Hermann Alexander; Singer, Hans Wolfgang, eds. (1921). "Souchon, Wilhelm Ferdinand". In Allgemeines Künstler-Lexicon. Leben und Werke der berühmtesten bildenden Künstler. 5th ed. Vol. 4: Raab–Vezzo. Frankfurt am Main: Literarische Anstalt, Rütten & Loening. p. 311.

1825 births
1876 deaths
19th-century German painters
People from Halberstadt